Edmond Darell "Clyde" Gates (born June 13, 1986) is a former American football wide receiver. Gates was drafted by the Miami Dolphins as the 111th overall pick in the 2011 NFL Draft. He is the cousin of running backs Bernard Scott and Daryl Richardson.

Early years
Gates had a rough childhood, growing up in a troubled neighborhood with his father serving 18 years in prison for murder. He intended on playing in the NBA after earning a scholarship to play basketball at Tyler Junior College in Texas. He was asked not to return for a second season; however, which led him to find a new future. He was recruited by Abilene Christian to play football in 2007.

College career
As a freshman in 2007, Clyde played in 11 games finishing with 12 catches for 285 yards and 1 touchdown. He also carried the ball 14 times for 189 yards and 4 more scores. He had 876 all-purpose yards in 2007. Gates finished his sophomore year playing 10 games, missing two games due to a leg injury early in the season, resulting in 31 catches for 716 yards and 8 touchdowns. His Junior year earned him the "top receiver for the Wildcats" with 702 yards with 5 touchdown, averaging 14.3 yards per catch.
Upon entering the 2011 NFL draft, he was selected in the 4th round with the 111th pick by the Miami Dolphins.

Professional career

Miami Dolphins
Gates scored his first touchdown in the Dolphins first preseason game on August 12, 2012 vs Atlanta.

Gates was released by the Dolphins on August 31, 2012.

New York Jets
Gates was claimed off waivers by the New York Jets on September 1, 2012.

Gates suffered a season-ending shoulder injury on October 13, 2013 and was placed on the injured reserve list two days later. He was released on August 30, 2014.

Tennessee Titans
On January 14, 2015, the Tennessee Titans signed Gates to a futures/reserve contract. He was waived on August 17, 2015.

Dallas Cowboys
On August 20, 2015, Gates signed with the Dallas Cowboys. He was released by the Cowboys on September 5, 2015.

References

External links
New York Jets bio
Miami Dolphins bio
Abilene Christian player profile

1986 births
Living people
People from Vernon, Texas
Players of American football from Texas
Tyler Apaches football players
American football wide receivers
Abilene Christian Wildcats football players
Miami Dolphins players
New York Jets players
Tennessee Titans players
Dallas Cowboys players